Jarjis Danho (born October 15, 1983) is a German professional mixed martial artist currently competing in the Heavyweight division of the Ultimate Fighting Championship.

Background
Danho is an Orthodox Christian Assyrian. His family fled to Germany from Syria in 1989. The family moved around Germany until they settled in Paderborn. Having a big stature already in his adolescent years, begun working in family businesses as a cook and a bouncer at the age of 14. Having a soccer and power-lifting background, Jarjis started boxing at the age of 27 and rapidly picked up mixed martial arts too.

Mixed martial arts career

Early career
Briefly after starting the sport, Danho made his amateur debut in 2011 and won the bout via first-minute knockout, subsequently turning professional.
In 2014, he fought in the MMA Championship "Desert Force." In 2015, he was considered the number one fighter in Germany in the over 120 kg weight class and signed a contract with the Ultimate Fighting Championship (UFC).

Ultimate Fighting Championship
In 2015, Danho was asked to replace Konstantin Erokhin to face Daniel Omielańczuk on short notice at UFC Fight Night: Bisping vs. Leites on July 18, 2015. However, his then-current organization Desert Force didn't allow him to sign with the UFC.

After his contract with Desert Force expired, Danho was able to sign with the UFC. The previously proposed matchup with Daniel Omielańczuk was rebooked to take place at UFC Fight Night: Silva vs. Bisping on February 27, 2016. He lost the bout via majority technical decision after being rendered unable to continue due to a groin punch.

Danho then faced Christian Colombo at UFC Fight Night 93 on September 3, 2016. The bout was declared a majority draw. Colombo was deducted one point in the first round after kneeing the downed Danho.

Danho was next scheduled to face Dmitry Poberezhets at UFC 211 on May 13, 2017. However, Danho pulled out of the fight citing an injury and was replaced by Chase Sherman.

After almost three-year absence from the octagon, Danho was scheduled to face Greg Hardy at UFC Fight Night 162 on October 26, 2019. Again, Danho was forced to withdraw from the bout due to an injury and was replaced by Ben Sosoli.

Danho was next scheduled to face Tai Tuivasa at UFC 251 but due to the COVID-19 pandemic, the event was moved to take place on June 6, 2020 in Abu Dhabi. Due to the change, the bout never took place.

Over four years removed from his previous bout, Danho returned to the UFC to face Yorgan De Castro at UFC on ABC: Vettori vs. Holland on April 10, 2021. He won the fight via knockout in the first round.

Mixed martial arts record

|-
|Win
|align=center| 6–1–1 (1)
|Yorgan De Castro
|KO (punch)
|UFC on ABC: Vettori vs. Holland
|
|align=center|1
|align=center|3:02
|Las Vegas, Nevada, United States
|
|-
|Draw
|align=center| 5–1–1 (1)
|Christian Colombo
|Draw (majority)
|UFC Fight Night: Arlovski vs. Barnett 
|
|align=center|3
|align=center|5:00
|Hamburg, Germany
|
|-
|Loss
|align=center| 5–1 (1)
|Daniel Omielańczuk
|Technical Decision (majority)
|UFC Fight Night: Silva vs. Bisping 
|
|align=center|3
|align=center|1:31
|London, England
|
|-
|Win
|align=center| 5–0 (1)
|Stefan Traunmueller
|TKO (punches)
|Desert Force 17: Homecoming
|May 25, 2015	
|align=center|1
|align=center|4:07
|Amman, Jordan
|
|-
|Win
|align=center| 4–0 (1)
|Marcus Vänttinen
|TKO (punches)
|Cage 29 
|Feb 28, 2015
|align=center|3
|align=center|3:22
|Helsinki, Finland
|
|-
|Win
|align=center| 3–0 (1)
|Mohamed Abdel Karim
|TKO (punches)
|Desert Force 12: Jordan
|April 28, 2014
|align=center|1
|align=center|2:20
|Amman, Jordan
|
|-
|NC
|align=center| 2–0 (1)
|David Shvelidze
|NC (timekeeping error)
|Superior FC 13: First Defense
|Jun 1, 2013		
|align=center|3
|align=center|5:00
|Amman, Jordan
|
|-
|Win
|align=center| 2–0
|Igor Swonkin
|Submission (strikes)
| GMC 3: Cage Time 
|February 16, 2013
|align=center|1
|align=center|1:23
|Herne, Germany
|
|-
|Win
|align=center| 1–0
| Jermaine Van Rooy 
|TKO (punches)
|Respect FC 8
|Sep 22, 2012	
|align=center|1
|align=center|1:25
|Wuppertal, Germany
|

Amateur mixed martial arts record

|-
|Win
|align=center| 1–0
|Admir Bogucanin
|Submission (slam and punches)
|WOF: Tournament Round 1
|Feb 12, 2011
|align=center|1
|align=center|0:10
|Herne, Germany
|

See also 
 List of current UFC fighters
 List of male mixed martial artists

References

External links 
  
 

1983 births
Living people
Heavyweight mixed martial artists
Mixed martial artists utilizing boxing
Ultimate Fighting Championship male fighters
Assyrian sportspeople
German people of Assyrian/Syriac descent
German male mixed martial artists
Syrian male mixed martial artists